Change Your Mind may refer to:

Television
 "Change Your Mind" (Steven Universe), an episode of the fifth season of Steven Universe

Songs
 "Change Your Mind" (Earth, Wind & Fire song), a song by Earth, Wind & Fire
 "Change Your Mind" (Keith Urban song), 2020
 "Change Your Mind" (Sharpe & Numan song), a song by Bill Sharpe and Gary Numan, No. 17 in the UK charts in 1985
 "Change Your Mind", a song by The All-American Rejects from Move Along
 "Change Your Mind", a song by Boyce Avenue from All You're Meant to Be
 "Change Your Mind", a song by Camper Van Beethoven from Our Beloved Revolutionary Sweetheart
 "Change Your Mind", a song by Eli, No. 41 on the German charts in 2018
 "Change Your Mind", a song by Jason Donovan from Ten Good Reasons
 "Change Your Mind", a song by The Killers from Hot Fuss
 "Change Your Mind", an unreleased song by Kylie Minogue
 "Change Your Mind", a song by LCD Soundsystem from American Dream
 "Change Your Mind", a song by Neil Young from Sleeps with Angels
 "Change Your Mind", a song by Raffaele Riefoli
 "Change Your Mind", a song by Ryan Adams from 1984
 "Change Your Mind", a song by Sister Hazel from Fortress
 "Change Your Mind", a song by Westlife from Face to Face
 "Change Your Mind (No Seas Cortes)", a song by Britney Spears from Glory

See also